is a Japanese four-panel manga series by Sō Hamayumiba, serialized in Houbunsha's seinen manga magazine Manga Time Kirara Carat since May 2015. It has been collected in six tankōbon volumes. An anime television series adaptation by Feel aired from October to December 2020.

Plot
Ino Sakura, a girl from Okayama Prefecture, decides to head to Tokyo in order to realize her dream of becoming an idol. Once she arrives there, she moves into a dormitory called Mouse House where she meets Roko Sekino, a former child actor, Hayu Nukui, a musician, and Nina Maehara, a model. When their manager, Hoho Kajino, informs them that Mouse House has been threatened to be demolished, the girls quickly form a new idol group called Fruit Tart in order to save their home.

Characters

Fruit Tart

A girl from Okayama Prefecture who moves to Tokyo to become an idol. She idolized Roko as a child and is surprised to learn that she is also a member of Fruit Tart.

A former child actor who gained fame for singing a promotional song about broccoli, a gig that she now regrets. She has a complex about her small size, amplified by how much taller her sister Chiko is despite being younger.

A musician and Ino's classmate. She is from a rich family and ran away from home as pursuing a singing career was against her family's wishes, although they later agree to sponsor Fruit Tart's show.
 

A model who is Roko's childhood friend. Roko and Hayu have a complex about her large breasts.
 

A newcomer idol who transfers to Rat Productions and becomes Fruit Tart's fifth member.

Cream Anmitsu

The leader of Cream Anmitsu and Roko's younger sister. She appears to have a sister complex for Roko and is a fan of Fruit Tart's online show.
 

Rua's twin sister.
 

Nua's twin sister.

Other characters

Fruit Tart's manager. Though she works with shady motives from time to time, she pulls through somehow as manager.

Ino and Hayu's classmate who is a fan of Fruit Tart. She later becomes an assistant for the group.

A childhood friend of Hoho's who works as the producer of Cream Anmitsu.

The acting president of Cat Productions.

Media

Manga
Dropout Idol Fruit Tart is written and illustrated by Sō Hamayumiba. It debuted as a guest series in the January to March 2015 issues of Houbunsha's Manga Time Kirara Carat magazine, which were released from November 28, 2014 to January 28, 2015. The series then began serialization in the July 2015 issue, which was released on May 28, 2015. It has been compiled into six tankōbon volumes as of February 25, 2022. Houbunsha published an anthology of the series on October 27, 2020.

Volume list

Anime
The 12-episode anime television series adaptation was announced in the May issue of Manga Time Kirara Carat on March 28, 2019. The series was animated by Feel and directed by Keiichiro Kawaguchi, with Kawaguchi and Tatsuya Takahashi handling series composition, and Sumie Kinoshita designing the characters. Monaca composed the series' music. It was set to premiere in July 2020, but it was delayed until October 2020 due to the COVID-19 pandemic. Hiyori Nitta, Risa Kubota, Haruka Shiraishi, Reina Kondō, and Kyōka Moriya performed the opening theme song "Kibō Darake no Everyday!", as well as the ending theme song "Wonder!" as their characters. The series aired from October 12 to December 28, 2020 on AT-X and other channels.

Funimation acquired the series and streamed it on its website in North America and the British Isles, and on AnimeLab in Australia and New Zealand. On October 17, 2021, Funimation announced that the series would receive an English dub, which premiered the following day.

Episode list

Video game
Characters from the series appear alongside other Manga Time Kirara characters in the 2020 mobile RPG, Kirara Fantasia.

See also
Hanayamata – Another manga series by the same author

Notes

References

External links
  
 

2015 manga
Anime postponed due to the COVID-19 pandemic
Anime series based on manga
AT-X (TV network) original programming
Comedy anime and manga
Crunchyroll anime
Feel (animation studio)
Houbunsha manga
Japanese idols in anime and manga
School life in anime and manga
Seinen manga
Yonkoma